Tom Campbell Black (December 1899 – 19 September 1936) was an English aviator.

He was the son of Alice Jean McCullough and Hugh Milner Black. He became a world-famous aviator when he and C. W. A. Scott won the London to Melbourne Centenary Air Race in 1934.

Early years
Tom Campbell Black attended Brighton College and the records for the period summer 1915 to summer 1917 indicate that he entered Hampden House, May 1915, was appointed House Prefect, January 1917 and played Second XI Football, 1915 to 1916 and 1916 to 1917. Campbell Black attended Army Class II and entered the RN College at Greenwich and attained a commission in the R.N.A.S. (Naval Air Service). He served first as a pilot in the Naval Air Service and later in the RAF during the Great War, rising to the rank of captain. Arriving in Africa as a soldier settler in 1922, he joined his brother, Frank Milner Black, who had been stationed as a soldier in Kenya and decommissioned in 1920. Black family history has it that Tom and his brother managed a coffee plantation in British East Africa, in the 1920s. Tom was a noted horseman who was an award-winning show jumper, winning a competition in 1925. He later bred and raised race horses, which remained a passion of his throughout his life.

It is stated in the Shuttleworth Collection Records, England, that an aircraft currently in their collection, a de Havilland DH.51, was built in 1925 and shortly after John Evans Carberry bought and shipped it to Mombasa. The DH.51 first flew in Africa on 4 April 1926. In June 1928, Tom Campbell Black, G. Skinner and A. Hughes bought the aircraft and on 10 September 1928, it became the first aircraft to be registered in Kenya. Named Miss Kenya, it was first registered G-KAA, but with the change in the registration system, it was re-registered VP-KAA.

Wilson Airways
After flying with Campbell Black in February 1929, Florence Kerr Wilson was encouraged by his enthusiasm to form Wilson Airways Ltd., in Kenya. At inception later in the same year, her airline possessed a single Gypsy Moth aircraft, primarily piloted by Campbell Black. The airline grew into a comprehensive air carrier across Kenya. Captain Hugo Dunkerley, the editor of Aeroken and the special correspondent of the East African Standard, accompanied Campbell Black in the first flight from Nairobi to Mombasa and back in a single day, on 21 November 1929. He also accompanied Tom in November 1930 on a roundtrip flight from Nairobi to Dar es Salaam, Mombasa, and back to Nairobi in just over nine hours. Tom Campbell Black was the managing director/chief pilot of Wilson Airways, but in March 1932, he resigned from Wilson Airways and left Kenya to take up an employment offer made by Lord Marmaduke Furness, a renowned horse breeder, to be his personal pilot and live back in England.

While the company was profitable, Wilson Airways was disbanded in 1939 with the outbreak of the Second World War.

The Ernst Udet rescue
In the 20 October 1934 Time Magazine report of the London to Melbourne Air Race, a mention is made of an incident that happened concerning Black: "Captain T. Campbell Black [was] famed for his spectacular rescue of Ernst Udet, German War Ace, in the desert wastes of the treacherous Nile country three years ago." A reference to this act is found in Ernst Udet's Ace of the Iron Cross.

An account of the rescue follows:

The London to Melbourne Centenary Air Race

In 1934, Campbell Black and C. W. A. Scott were entered in the London to Melbourne Air Race, officially known as the "MacRobertson Air Race". Recorded as Captain T. Campbell Black in the starters list for the race, Campbell Black and C. W. A. Scott won the "Speed Section" of the race in an extraordinary time of 71 hours, and won the First Place Prize of 10,000 pounds. They also won the "Handicap Section" but the race rules didn't allow them to win the two sections. Black and Scott were awarded "The Britannia Trophy" and a gold medal by the Royal Aero Club, England, presented "For the British Aviator or Aviators accomplishing the most meritorious performance in aviation during the previous year."

The Manx Air Race
The following report was made on an air race held at the Isle of Man: Manx Air Race 1932. Held Saturday, 18 June, total Island course: . At the end of the two laps it was Ashwell Cook with Tom Campbell Black as navigator, who came through to win in a Cirrus Moth aircraft averaging .

Beryl Markham
Campbell Black also had a long-term affair with Beryl Markham, an aviator who lived in Kenya who had been introduced to aviation by Campbell Black. He subsequently became her flight instructor, which Markham describes in her memoir West with the Night. In September 1936, Beryl Markham achieved fame by being the first solo female aviator to fly the Atlantic Ocean from East to West (from England to America), against the prevailing winds.

The Schlesinger Race and Death
In the same year, Tom Campbell Black had entered an air race from England to Johannesburg, South Africa, "The Schlesinger Race", flown from 29 September 1936 to 1 October 1936, the race offered a prize of £10,000 to the winner. Campbell Black was one of the three favourites to win the race, all flying Percival E2H Mew Gulls.

On 19 September 1936, while preparing for the race, he was killed at Liverpool, Speke Airport, in a ground collision. A RAF bomber that had landed ran into Black's Mew Gull as he taxied out for take off. Black was reputed to have been looking down at his map at the time. The propeller of the large biplane tore through the side of Black's cockpit, striking and mortally wounding him in the chest and shoulder. He died on the way to hospital. He left a widow, the English actress Florence Desmond, whom he had married in 1935.

The winners of the "Schlesinger Race" were C. W. A. Scott, (Black's co-pilot in the 1934 MacRoberts Race) and Giles Guthrie.

Fatal incident at Speke Airport
The following is a transcript of Incidents Report at Speke Airport:

References

Notes

Bibliography

 Markham, Beryl. West with the Night. New York: North Point Press, 1942; reprinted, 1983. .
 McCullough, Bruce. Tom Campbell Black: Pioneer Aviator. Auckland. Tom Campbell Black
 Udet, Ernst. Ace of the Iron Cross. New York: Arco Publishing, 1981. .

External links

The MacRobertson Air Race, 1934
Tom Campbell Black
Norman Black a renowned motor cycle and motor car racing driver 1920-1950s Cousin of Tom Campbell Black

1899 births
1936 deaths
People from Brighton
People educated at Brighton College
English aviators
Royal Air Force officers
Britannia Trophy winners